was the eldest son of Itakura Katsuzumi and the second Itakura Daimyō of Bitchū-Matsuyama Domain.

Family
 Father: Itakura Katsuzumi 
 Mother: Nezu clan’s daughter
 Wife: Hoshoin, Wakisaka Yasuoki’s daughter
 Concubine: Ichiba clan’s daughter
 Children:
 Daughter married Itakura Katsuyuki
 Daughter married Yamauchi Toyoyasu

Title

Daimyo
1736 births
1769 deaths
Itakura clan